Mohamed Maher (born 26 May 1992) is an Egyptian handball player for Al Gazira and the Egyptian national team.

He represented Egypt at the 2019 World Men's Handball Championship.

References

1992 births
Living people
Egyptian male handball players
21st-century Egyptian people